Martin Bursík (born 12 August 1959 in Prague) is a Czech politician. Bursík has twice served as Minister of the Environment and is also former chairman of the Green Party.

Early life and education 
In the 1980s, Bursík studied environmental engineering at the Charles University. In June 1989, he joined the dissident movement and signed the declaration of the anti-communist movement. During the Velvet Revolution in November 1989, he was one of the founders of the Civic Forum.

The Civic Movement, which emerged from the Civic Forum and would later become the Party for the Open Society, nominated him as vice-chairman and he was elected into parliament. After the breakup of the Civic Movement, Bursík switched to the Free Democrats. He served as the Minister of the Environment under Josef Tošovský for a few months in 1998.

Bursík unsuccessfully ran for mayor of Prague and joined the Christian Democrats but left this party in 2003.

He joined the Green Party in June 2004 and was elected party chairman. After 2006 parliament election he became a member of the Chamber of Deputies and was also appointed Minister of the Environment in the second cabinet of Prime Minister Mirek Topolánek.

His priority as Minister of the Environment was climate change.

As of 2014 he is a professor at New York University in Prague.

References

  Schwarz, Karl-Peter: "Außen neureich, innen grün" in FAZ May 9, 2006 pg. D8.

1959 births
Politicians from Prague
Living people
Members of the Chamber of Deputies of the Czech Republic (2006–2010)
Environment ministers of the Czech Republic
Leaders of the Green Party (Czech Republic)
Charles University alumni
Green Party (Czech Republic) Government ministers
KDU-ČSL politicians
Green Party (Czech Republic) MPs